Kate Elizabeth Kniveton (previously Griffiths; born 1971) is a British politician who has served as the Member of Parliament (MP) for Burton in Staffordshire since 2019. She is a member of the Conservative Party.   She was elected to Parliament under her married name of Griffiths but reverted to using her maiden name in 2022.

Early life and career
Kate Elizabeth Kniveton was born in Burton upon Trent. She was privately educated at St. Wystan's School in Repton and Derby High School, Derbyshire. She studied classics at the University of Exeter. She worked for five years as the corporate hospitality coordinator for the football club Burton Albion FC.

Political career
After her ex-husband, Andrew, stood for reselection as the Conservative candidate for Burton in the 2019 general election, she stood against him but the vote ended in a tie. He then withdrew his candidacy rather than face a second vote in which he would face other candidates including his estranged wife. She was selected in the subsequent contest. Her campaign focussed on promises on local issues such as investment in the local area's high streets, and national issues including Brexit. She also pledged to be an advocate for domestic abuse survivors. She was elected as MP for Burton in the 2019 general election with a majority of 14,496. Kniveton opposed the proposed MP pay rise in 2020, which was eventually scrapped.

Personal life 
Kniveton married Burton MP Andrew Griffiths in 2013. They had a daughter in 2018. He resigned as small business minister and was suspended from the Conservative Party after The Sunday Mirror reported that he had sent up to 2,000 sexually explicit text messages over a three-week period in 2018 to two women. Kniveton reported that she left him the day that he had told her about it, and that she had later started divorce proceedings.

They separated in 2018 and subsequently divorced. 

In December 2021 it was revealed that a Family Court judge had earlier ruled that Kniveton had been repeatedly raped and sexually assaulted by her then husband. Family Court decisions are not usually publicised and, as a complainant in a case of alleged sexual misconduct, Kate Kniveton had a statutory right of anonymity. However she waived that right of anonymity and in July 2021 a High Court judge (Lieven J), on appeal from the Family Court at first instance, ruled that the public interest was served by permitting publication of aspects of the Family Court’s findings. This decision was upheld on 10 December 2021 by the Court of Appeal.

References

External links

Living people
UK MPs 2019–present
21st-century British women politicians
Conservative Party (UK) MPs for English constituencies
Female members of the Parliament of the United Kingdom for English constituencies
People from Burton upon Trent
Politicians from Staffordshire
21st-century English women
21st-century English people
1971 births
Spouses of British politicians